Christian Lundgaard (born 23 July 2001) is a Danish professional racing driver who is driving the No. 45 Honda for Rahal Letterman Lanigan Racing in the IndyCar Series. He was the 2022 IndyCar Series Rookie of the Year, and was a member of the Alpine Academy from 2017 until 2022.

Lundgaard began his single-seater career in 2017, where he won the F4 Spanish and SMP F4 Championship in his debut year. In 2018, he made a move to the Formula Renault Eurocup, where he placed runner-up to Max Fewtrell. He secured a promotion to ART Grand Prix in the 2019 FIA Formula 3 Championship where he ended 6th. Lundgaard continued with ART Grand Prix for the 2020 Formula 2 Championship and took two wins to place 7th overall. However, a poor 2021 season saw him make a switch to IndyCar for 2022.

Junior career

Karting 
Lundgaard began karting professionally in 2012. He competed all across Europe and collected three major titles along the way, including the 2015 CIK-FIA Karting European Championship.  In December 2016, Lundgaard was ranked fifth on a list compiled by Motorsport.com of the top ten karting drivers with future potential.

Lower formulae 
In 2017, Lundgaard made his single-seater debut in the SMP F4 and Spanish F4 championships with MP Motorsport, at the age of 15. In SMP F4, he claimed nine victories, seven pole positions and ten fastest laps and claimed the championship with one round to go. In the Spanish F4 Championship, Lundgaard won six races, including all the races at Aragón to become champion.

Formula Renault Eurocup 

In 2018, after testing with them at the post-season test, Lundgaard reunited with MP Motorsport for the Eurocup championship. His first podium of the season came with a third place during the second race at Paul Ricard. His win would not be too far away, as he took his first victory in the series during the next round at Monza, defended from Lorenzo Colombo and duly taking the lead of the championship. A retirement and four consecutive fifth-placed finishes followed, before he was back on the podium during the second race at the Red Bull Ring. The next round at Spa-Francorchamps, saw Lundgaard win the first race and take the Eurocup lead. A double podium including a win at the Hungaroring saw him into serious championship contention. However, a double retirement at the Hockenheimring left his championship chances dented and trailing leader and fellow Renault junior Max Fewtrell by 36.5 points heading into the final round. Despite "taking more risk" to claim a win and a second place at the final round in Barcelona, he was unable to overhaul the points tally of Fewtrell, leaving the British driver to be crowned champion by 17.5 points. In an article by Motorsport.com, Lundgaard was ranked 13th of their top 20 junior drivers in 2018.

GP3 Series 
In June 2018, Lundgaard joined MP for the third round of the 2018 championship at Paul Ricard. In December, he returned for the final post-season test, driving for ART Grand Prix.

FIA Formula 3 Championship 

Following his success in Formula Renault, Lundgaard was linked with a seat at ART Grand Prix for the inaugural FIA Formula 3 Championship. In January 2019, the French outfit confirmed Lundgaard would race with them, alongside Eurocup rival Max Fewtrell and David Beckmann. Before the season, Lundgaard competed in the last round of the Asian F3 Winter series.

During the first round at Barcelona, Lundgaard qualified second for his first race. He passed polesitter Robert Shwartzman at the start and never looked back to win the race, but was demoted five seconds for exceeding the virtual safety car delta. Nevertheless, it was his first podium in Formula 3. He followed it up with sixth in Race 2. The next two rounds were poor for Lundgaard, he retired in the first race at Le Castellet due to a broken suspension, but recovered to 15th the next day. At Austria, Lundgaard qualified fifth but was disqualified from qualifying due to a physio issue. Contact with Ye Yifei saw him only finish 26th in the first race, and climbed to 17th in the second.

In Silverstone, Lundgaard started fourth in Race 1 and passed Marcus Armstrong at the start but would eventually fall to seventh. Starting second in Race 2, he was passed by both Pedro Piquet and Leonardo Pulcini on the final lap. Lundgaard lost more positions but benefitted from a collision in the end to secure fifth place. In the Hungaroring, Lundgaard had a breakthrough weekend, topping practice and then later taking his first ever F3 pole. He had a dominant race and led teammate Fewtrell home to take his win in the series. In Race 2, he claimed fifth place, which kept him in championship contention. In Spa-Francorchamps, Lundgaard qualified all the way down in 13th, but finished fourth in both races.

In Monza, Lundgaard took his second pole of the year. He would not score any more points for the rest of the season. In Race 1, Lundgaard was overtaken by Lirim Zendeli at the start of the race. However, on lap 3 he made contact with Zendeli, which damaged Lundgaard's front wing. He pitted for a front wing change and finished 13th. In Race 2, Lundgaard progressed to ninth place, missing out on a point. In Sochi, Lundgaard qualified fifth, but was hit at the back by Jüri Vips and fell near the back. He improve to finish 14th, and then in Race 2 finished tenth. Lundgaard ended the championship in 6th place with 97 points, as the leading ART Grand Prix driver. He scored a win and another podium during the season. Lundgaard then took part in post-season testing in October, where he topped the first and second days.

Lundgaard reunited with ART to contest the Macau Grand Prix, which saw him finish third in the qualification race and fourth in the main event.

FIA Formula 2 Championship

2019 
In November 2019, it was announced Lundgaard would partake in the season finale at Yas Marina with Trident, replacing Ralph Boschung. Lundgaard finished the races in 14th and 12th, ending 23rd in the championship.

2020 
After taking part in post-season testing with ART Grand Prix, In January, it was announced that Lundgaard would drive for the French outfit during the full 2020 Formula 2 season alongside 2019 Formula 3 runner-up Marcus Armstrong. Lundgaard missed the whole of pre-season testing at the Bahrain International Circuit due to an outbreak of COVID-19 in his hotel, therefore he was forced to be quarantined for several days. Due to the mentioned virus, the season would eventually be postponed to July. During the lockdown, Lundgaard participated in various 2020 Virtual Grands Prix for Renault.

For the first round at the Red Bull Ring, Lundgaard qualified fourth and finished in the same position, taking advantage of a car issue for Guanyu Zhou and a mistake for Mick Schumacher late in the race. He finished the sprint race where he started, in fifth place, marking a solid Formula 2 debut for Lundgaard. During the second Red Bull Ring round, he took eighth place in qualifying. He put a small overtaking masterclass in early wet part of the feature race, moving up to fourth at one point, but he would eventually finish sixth. In the sprint race from third, Lundgaard moved past teammate Armstrong at the start, and then later on Dan Ticktum. He then came through for his maiden F2 win, winning by two seconds. On his performance so far, Lundgaard said that it was "better than expected" following missing testing. His strong showing saw him 2nd in the standings, 5 points behind leader Robert Shwartzman.

Lundgaard qualified sixth at Hungary and moved up to fourth at the start of the feature race. However when trying to pass Luca Ghiotto, he hit his rear tyre, causing damage to Lundgaard's front wing and puncturing his tyre. He eventually retired on lap 10. Lundgaard made a recovery charge in the sprint race and finished 13th. In Silverstone, Lundgaard started third due to Callum Ilott stalling. Nikita Mazepin passed him at the start but eventually moved back into third after dispatching polesitter Felipe Drugovich. He was in second place during the final stages of the race, but during the final three laps was passed by Guanyu Zhou and Yuki Tsunoda on fresher tyres, falling to fourth place. In the sprint race, Lundgaard made a good start, jumping to second on the first lap. A spin for Ilott mid-race saw Lundgaard pit for tyres, he charged back to second late in the race but ran out of time to catch eventual winner Dan Ticktum. In the second Silverstone round, Lundgaard qualified second missing out on pole to Ilott, admitting that a mistake costed a chance of a maiden pole. In the feature race, he dropped to fourth at the start but quickly moved back to second shortly. He eventually finished in that position, nine seconds behind winner Ilott. In the sprint race while running seventh, Lundgaard's front-left tyre punctured on lap 16 which dropped him to last place. In the Barcelona round, Lundgaard had an inferior weekend, he finished both races in 11th place.

In Spa-Francorchamps, Lundgaard qualified in a disappointing 17th place and finished the feature race in the same position. He had a lightning start in the sprint race, moving to ninth by lap 4. He eventually finished the race in seventh place, and despite the result, fell out of the top five in the standings. In Monza, Lundgaard started fourth, and moved to second after the pit stops after Ilott's slow pit stop. On the third last lap however, Ghiotto passed him and Lundgaard eventually finished in third place. Lundgaard charged to third place in the sprint race, benefitting on retirements from Tsunoda and Zhou. However, he was promoted to second place after Ticktum was disqualified. In Mugello, Lundgaard claimed his maiden pole, five thousandths of a second ahead of Ticktum. He led majority of the race until the safety car restart on lap 31 of 33, where Lundgaard was passed by both Hitech drivers on fresher tyres. His rivals later also overtook him, dropping him to sixth when the chequered flag fell. In the sprint race, Lundgaard passed Jüri Vips and Artem Markelov to storm into the lead by the first corner. He eventually won the race by an astonishing 14 seconds and moved into third in the championship.

In Sochi, Lundgaard qualified in sixth place. However, a slow getaway saw him drop down the order, before being hit by Pedro Piquet saw Lundgaard's race come to a close. A red-flagged sprint race saw Lundgaard end 13th. Heading into the final two rounds of the season, Lundgaard sat fourth in the standings, 46 points behind leader Schumacher. In the first Bahrain round, Lundgaard finished the feature race in 19th, but stormed through the field to finish sixth in the sprint race. In the final round of the season, Lundgaard finished both races out of the points, as during the feature race he stalled from sixth on the grid whilst also causing a small controversy of unlapping the race leaders while battling. Lundgaard finished 7th in the championship with 149 points, massively outscoring teammate Armstrong's 52 whilst helping ART finish 5th in the championship.

2021 

He was retained by ART Grand Prix for the 2021 FIA Formula 2 season. On his new deal, Lundgaard aimed to improve on consistency and fight for the title. However, his season would not go as planned.

At the Bahrain season opener, Lundgaard qualified second behind fellow Alpine junior Guanyu Zhou, missing out by 0.003 seconds. He described that his small deficit to Zhou "hurts". In the first sprint race, Lundgaard made up places at the start and finished sixth. In the second sprint race, Lundgaard slipped from fifth to seventh, and then later clipped the back of Lirim Zendeli whilst trying to overtaking to him and causing the German driver a puncture. Lundgaard was handed a 10-second penalty for that, and served it during the safety car as well as pitted for new rubber. He made up places as on the final lap, battled with his Alpine juniors Zhou and Oscar Piastri, but Lundgaard would eventually finish in second place. He did not appear on the podium due to being demoted due to a safety car infrigement, but he was later reinstated to second. In the feature race, Lundgaard took the lead of softer tyres, but lost the lead on lap 13 to Piastri. Following a safety car restart on lap 19, Lundgaard lost positions to rivals on fresher tyres and ended tenth, later dropping to 12th due to a safety car infringement.

In Monaco, Lundgaard qualified eighth to start third in the first sprint. He jumped Felipe Drugovich at the start but on lap 12, smoke starting pouring at the back of his car, in which Drugovich described being behind Lundgaard "a nightmare". Three laps later, Lundgaard parked his car at Mirabeau to retire. Sprint Race 2 was not successful either, he collided with the wall at Mirabeau, but was able to continue, only to retire with a mechanical issue. In the feature race, Lundgaard finished tenth, but was once again denied points again due to speeding in the pit lane and earning himself a time penalty which dropped him to 12th. He then stated that "Nothing went my way" in the point-less round.

Lundgaard's bad form continued in Baku, where he qualified 12th. However, he was demoted to start 15th in the sprint race due to impeding qualifying Zhou in qualifying. In the first sprint race, Lundgaard improved to 11th position, but in the second sprint race was spun into the wall by Felipe Drugovich on lap 8, whilst running in the top 10. The feature race was slightly successful, as Lundgaard made the overcut on his few rivals to gain positions and finish in the points with nine points. In Silverstone, Lundgaard qualified tenth which gave him reverse pole for the first sprint. He had a slow start, and fell to third after losing positions to Robert Shwartzman and Jüri Vips. He would remain in third for the remainder of the race, scoring his first podium since the opening round. More bad luck for Lundgaard, as he stalled on the formation lap, and was consigned to start from the pit lane and recovered to 13th. In the feature race during his pit stop, Lundgaard's rear-left wheel came off suddenly in the pit lane, which gave him a ten-second penalty. In a race where all runners finished, Lundgaard finished 21st. By the halfway point of the season, Lundgaard sat 12th in the standings, only with 29 points.

Despite making his IndyCar debut, Lundgaard was confirmed to finish the 2021 F2 season. In Monza, Lundgaard qualified a season-worst 19th. In the first sprint race, many rivals suffered misfortunes and he made overtakes, even on then championship leader Piastri. Lundgaard finished fourth on the road, but Shwartzman was given a penalty, promoting Lundgaard to third in a spectacular recovery drive. In the second sprint, Lundgaard finished 14th after being spun around on the opening lap. In the feature race, Lundgaard went on the alternate strategy by starting on the harder tyres. He made up positions during a late safety car and finished 11th, before being promoted to tenth due to a disqualification from Richard Verschoor. In Russia, Lundgaard qualified 12th, and took points in both races by finishing seventh and ninth, benefitting from others' mishaps.

In Jeddah, Lundgaard qualified fourth. In a highly entertaining race in the first sprint, Lundgaard was involved in a tense battle with teammate Pourchaire, Piastri and Jehan Daruvala to eventually finish seventh. However, Daruvala was given a penalty for an off-track advantage, promoting Lundgaard to sixth.  In the second sprint race, Lundgaard made up two places from fifth to third at the start and fought for the lead, but was given a 5-second time penalty for cutting the corner whilst fighting Bent Viscaal. When Liam Lawson crashed and bunched the safety car right at the end of the race, the field was bunched up which demoted Lundgaard to 15th. In a red-flagged feature race that ended early, Lundgaard lost positions to eighth at the start. He made up a place on Marcus Armstrong to finish seventh. In Abu Dhabi, Lundgaard ended his Formula 2 career, sprint race 1 was affected by Viscaal hitting him, sprint race 2 was marred by a puncture caused by colliding with Roy Nissany and the feature race was caused by early front wing damage. Lundgaard ended the championship in 12th place 50 points compared to teammate Pourchaire with a mammoth 140 in 5th, and was also Lundgaard's worst placing in a full-time series.

Formula One 
In March 2017, Lundgaard was signed to the Renault Sport Academy. Following the 2019 FIA Formula 3 Championship, Lundgaard was invited to a private Formula One test at the Hungaroring, where he got his first taste of a Formula One car testing the Renault R.S.17. He would also get another test with the R.S.17 later at Circuito de Jerez in November.

In October 2020, Lundgaard and fellow academy member Guanyu Zhou got another F1 test, testing the Renault R.S.18 at the Bahrain International Circuit. Lundgaard then stated on his experience that "he felt comfortable straight away on his first run".

Lundgaard was included in the lineup of the team's academy when it was rebranded to Alpine F1 Team in 2021. In addition to that, Lundgaard was given a role as a simulator driver in the team for 2021. He tested the 2018 Renault R.S.18 in June at Silverstone, following his Baku weekend. Lundgaard left the academy before the 2022 season, as he made his transition to IndyCar.

IndyCar

Rahal Letterman Lanigan Racing (2021–)

2021 season 
In July 2021, Lundgaard tested an IndyCar with Rahal Letterman Lanigan Racing at Barber Motorsports Park. A month later, he joined the team for his IndyCar debut at the 2021 Big Machine Spiked Coolers Grand Prix at Indianapolis Motor Speedway. On debut, Lundgaard qualified an impressive fourth and finished the race in twelfth.

2022 season 
On 20 October 2021, it was announced that Lundgaard would join Rahal Letterman Lanigan Racing on a multi-year IndyCar deal, starting from the 2022 season. He partnered Jack Harvey and Graham Rahal throughout the season. Lundgaard stated that there was "always a chance for F1" despite spending a season in IndyCar. Lundgaard made his full time IndyCar debut at the 2022 Firestone Grand Prix of St. Petersburg, qualifying in 15th.
He went on to finish the race in 11th place, after slipping outside of the top 10 during the last few laps of the Grand Prix. The next race at the Texas Moto Speedway saw Lundgaard qualify a low 25th at his first oval track, but retired after contact with Colton Herta. The third round at the 2022 Acura Grand Prix of Long Beach brought more disappointment, as on lap 31 he ran out of fuel while making his way to the pits, and was left two laps down to finish 18th. The fifth round in the 2022 GMR Grand Prix saw Lundgaard qualify eighth, but lost positions at the start as he went off onto the grass. An eventful race saw him who was down in 27th at one point, finish ninth.

At the 2022 Indy 500, Lundgaard became the first Danish driver to race in the Indianapolis 500, he finished 18th. At the eighth round at the 2022 Sonsio Grand Prix at Road America, Lundgaard led a lap during the race, and worked his way to finish tenth. For the tenth round during the 2022 Honda Indy Toronto, Lundgaard once again qualified in the top 10. In the race, Lundgaard gained positions when others made contact and took eighth place, his highest finish in IndyCar up till that point. Lundgaard added another tenth place finish in the first Iowa race, but in the second race, his races was ended early by a brake issue.

The thirteenth round, at the 2022 Gallagher Grand Prix saw Lundgaard qualify sixth. He moved into fourth at the race start and passed Felix Rosenqvist on lap 9 for third. He overtook Colton Herta for second after the American slowed. Lundgaard even pressured race leader Alexander Rossi for the lead, but had to settle for second. Despite that, it was his first ever IndyCar podium and said that "it feels amazing". Lundgaard followed it up with a best third in qualifying at the 2022 Big Machine Music City Grand Prix. With two laps to go, Lundgaard steered out of trouble as he faced a safety car whilst in third place. However, he suddenly dropped to eighth at the flag. A poor weekend in the 2022 Bommarito Automotive Group 500 followed, before qualifying fourth in the penultimate race in Portland. However his first pit stop had problems, and he fell near outside the top 10. He tried to recover, but near the end Lundgaard made a mistake and collected a foam barrier dropping him to 21st as he was forced to pit. The final race at Laguna Seca saw Lundgaard qualify 16th, but brilliantly improved to finish fifth. Lundgaard ended his rookie season of IndyCar in 14th with 323 points. This meant that he won the Rookie Of The Year, beating his closest rookie rival David Malukas by 18 points. On his rookie title, Lundgaard expressed that his "route to IndyCar rookie title was very tough".

2023 season 
In August 2022, Lundgaard signed a contract to remain with Rahal Letterman Lanigan Racing for 2023 and beyond.

Personal life
Lundgaard's father is 2000 European Rally champion Henrik Lundgaard. His brother, Daniel, raced alongside Christian in the 2017 F4 Danish Championship and now designs his race helmets.

Karting record

Karting career summary

Racing record

Racing career summary 

‡ Lundgaard was ineligible for points from the third round onwards.
† As Lundgaard was a guest driver, he was ineligible for points.

Complete SMP F4 Championship results 
(key) (Races in bold indicate pole position) (Races in italics indicate fastest lap)

Complete F4 Spanish Championship results 
(key) (Races in bold indicate pole position) (Races in italics indicate fastest lap)

Complete F4 Danish Championship results 
(key) (Races in bold indicate pole position) (Races in italics indicate fastest lap)

Complete Formula Renault Northern European Cup results 
(key) (Races in bold indicate pole position) (Races in italics indicate fastest lap)

‡ Lundgaard was ineligible for points from the third round onwards.

Complete Formula Renault Eurocup results 
(key) (Races in bold indicate pole position) (Races in italics indicate fastest lap)

Complete GP3 Series results 
(key) (Races in bold indicate pole position) (Races in italics indicate fastest lap)

Complete FIA Formula 3 Championship results 
(key) (Races in bold indicate pole position; races in italics indicate points for the fastest lap of top ten finishers)

Complete Macau Grand Prix results

Complete FIA Formula 2 Championship results  
(key) (Races in bold indicate pole position) (Races in italics indicate points for the fastest lap of top ten finishers)

‡ Half points awarded as less than 75% of race distance was completed.

American open-wheel racing results 
(key)

IndyCar Series 
(key)

Indianapolis 500 

* Season still in progress.

References

External links 
 

2001 births
Living people
Danish racing drivers
Spanish F4 Championship drivers
SMP F4 Championship drivers
Formula Renault Eurocup drivers
People from Hedensted Municipality
Formula Renault 2.0 NEC drivers
GP3 Series drivers
FIA Formula 3 Championship drivers
FIA Formula 2 Championship drivers
IndyCar Series drivers
Indianapolis 500 drivers
MP Motorsport drivers
ART Grand Prix drivers
Trident Racing drivers
Rahal Letterman Lanigan Racing drivers
Sportspeople from the Central Denmark Region
Pinnacle Motorsport drivers
F3 Asian Championship drivers
Karting World Championship drivers
Danish F4 Championship drivers